Begbroke Science Park is a science park located five miles north of Oxford, England.  It is owned by Oxford University and managed as part of the university's Mathematical, Physical and Life Sciences Division  It lies within the parish of Begbroke, although it is only accessible from the village of Yarnton on the A44.

History 
The site has been the home of research facilities since 1960, when the Weed Research Organisation was established there. It was later used as the Technology Centre of the Cookson Group. The site was bought by Oxford University in 1998, arranged by Professor Brian Cantor and supported by the then Registrar, David Hughes, and Vice-Chancellor, Colin Lucas. Brian Cantor became the first academic director from 1998 to 2002.

Professor Peter Dobson was appointed as the academic director in 2002. Since then the Science Park has doubled in size, hosts more than 30 companies and has more than 20 research groups from 6 different University Departments. A new access road opened in 2012.

The university owns  of land surrounding the research park, mainly devoted to agriculture, of which the Science Park is developed on a 10-acre site at the centre.

Research groups 

There are over 20 research groups on the site variously from the Departments of Materials, Engineering Science, and Earth Sciences, with Physics, the OeRC and Business Services and Projects all represented in Oxford Supercomputer machine room. 
Highlighted areas include:
 Begbroke Nano- Dr Alison Crossley
 Processing of Advanced Materials Laboratory- Patrick Grant
 The Environmental Biotechnology team- Professor Ian Thompson
 Impact Engineering Laboratory - Professor Nik Petrinic
 Solar Energy Materials Initiative Research on Solar Cells
 Oxford Materials Electron Microscopy and Micro analysis Group
 Oxford University Supercomputer

Commercial activities 

Begbroke Science Park has over 30 different high tech spin out and start-up companies. In 2017, a new science enterprise centre, known as the Begbroke Innovation Accelerator, was opened in the park as an extension of the Centre for Innovation and Enterprise.

Knowledge transfer 

Two Knowledge Transfer Network (KTN) units are located on the site:
 Environmental Knowledge Transfer Network (ESKTN), which works across four subject areas: Water management, distributed renewable energy, waste management and resource efficiency and sustainable land management and food production.
 Materials Knowledge Transfer Network, which provides access to the latest technological knowledge and international discoveries on materials: metals, composites, plastics, ceramics, minerals, technical textiles and smart materials. The team at Begbroke specialise in transport applications.

References

External links 
Begbroke Science Park website

1960 establishments in England
Economy of Oxfordshire
Parks and open spaces in Oxfordshire
Science and technology in Oxfordshire
Science parks in the United Kingdom
University of Oxford sites